The Walking Dead: Cold Storage is a four-part web series based on the television series The Walking Dead. It aired in its entirety on October 1, 2012, on AMC's official website, two weeks before the premiere of the third season of the show. The web series follows the story of a young man named Chase as he seeks shelter in a storage facility commanded by a malicious employee named B.J. This web series marks a second installment, following The Walking Dead: Torn Apart, which aired a year earlier.

Synopsis 
Chase (Josh Stewart) is portrayed as a survivor seeking refuge on a rooftop near Atlanta, Georgia. Despite his intention to reunite with his sister (who is referenced to be in a separate caravan), Chase and companion Harris (Chris Nelson) decide to investigate a nearby storage facility. The two are quickly swarmed by walkers and Harris is killed in the attack, but Chase manages to escape, unharmed, to one of the storage units. It is revealed that the storage units are under the sole command of a former employee named B.J., who is initially hostile to Chase. B.J. changes his mind after Chase offers to restore a damaged basement generator in exchange for one of B.J's box trucks. Chase takes some clothes from a storage unit which also contains family photo albums indicating it belonged to Rick Grimes. 

After a nonchalant B.J. fails to mention the presence of walkers in the basement, Chase's suspicions are raised. Chase's suspicions are confirmed when B.J. shows Chase a pile of dead bodies and mercilessly fires a shot at Chase, who collapses into the pile of bodies, apparently dead. 

Chase survives the shooting with only a graze to his temple and returns to the compound to take revenge. He inadvertently finds Kelly (a female employee B.J. claimed had called in sick the day "shit hit the fan"), who explains that B.J. murdered the other employees and forced her into sexual slavery. B.J., realizing the situation, confronts Kelly and her liberator, refusing to let Chase leave with her. The events of this standoff culminate in B.J.'s decapitation (presumably by Kelly) while the two survivors escape the compound in a box truck (implied to be low on gas). B.J.'s zombified head is shown on a table watching the surveillance monitors as the compound is overrun by walkers.

Cast 
 Josh Stewart as Chase
 Daniel Roebuck as B.J.
 Cerina Vincent as Kelly
 Chris Nelson as Harris

Crew 

 Director: Greg Nicotero
 Writer: John Esposito
 Producer: Sarah J. Donahue
 Executive producers: Michael Petok, Chris Pollack, and Jared Hoffman
 Composer: Kevin Blumenfeld
 Cinematography: Jonathan Hall
 Editors: Julius Ramsay and Dan Liu
 Production designer: Brett Snodgrass
 Art direction: Jenna Sanders
 Costume designer: Bonnie Stauch

Webisodes

References

External links 

 
 The Walking Dead: Cold Storage at the Internet Movie Database

Cold Storage
American prequel television series
American drama web series
American horror fiction television series
Horror fiction web series
Streamy Award-winning channels, series or shows
Zombie web series